The women's 100 metres event at the 1994 European Athletics Championships was held in Helsinki, Finland, at Helsinki Olympic Stadium on 7 and 8 August 1994.

Medalists

Results

Final
8 August
Wind: 0.6 m/s

Semi-finals
8 August

Semi-final 1
Wind: 0.6 m/s

Semi-final 2
Wind: 0.6 m/s

Second round
7 August

Quarter-final 1
Wind: 1.2 m/s

Quarter-final 2
Wind: 0.9 m/s

Quarter-final 3
Wind: 0.3 m/s

Heats
7 August

Heat 1
Wind: -0.6 m/s

Heat 2
Wind: 0.3 m/s

Heat 3
Wind: 0,4 m/s

Heat 4
Wind: 0.2 m/s

Heat 5
Wind: 0.2 m/s

Participation
According to an unofficial count, 32 athletes from 15 countries participated in the event.

 (2)
 (3)
 (2)
 (3)
 (2)
 (2)
 (1)
 (1)
 (2)
 (1)
 (3)
 (3)
 (1)
 (3)
 (3)

References

100 metres
100 metres at the European Athletics Championships
1994 in women's athletics